Peerkankaranai is a suburban neighborhood of Chennai in the Indian state of Tamil Nadu. It is governed by Tambaram Municipal Corporation.

Demographics
As of 2001 India census, Peerkankaranai had a population of 17,521. Males constitute 50% of the population and females 50%. Peerkankaranai has an average literacy rate of 82%, higher than the national average of 59.5%: male literacy is 86%, and female literacy is 79%. In Peerkankaranai, 10% of the population is under 6 years of age.

References

Cities and towns in Chengalpattu district
Suburbs of Chennai